The Orkney Amateur Football Association (OAFA) is a football (soccer) league competition for amateur clubs in Orkney, Scotland. The association is affiliated to the Scottish Amateur Football Association.  Like several other Highland and island leagues, fixtures are played over summer rather than the traditional winter calendar.

The association is composed of a two divisions of seven and five clubs. There is also an eight team reserve league.

League membership
In order to join the association, clubs need to apply and are then voted in by current member clubs.

2022 league members

A League
Dounby
East United
Kirkwall Hotspurs
Kirkwall Thorfinn
Kirkwall Rovers
Rendall
Stromness

B League
Kirkwall Accies
Streamline
Firth
Harray
Wanderers

External links
League Website

Football leagues in Scotland
Football in Orkney
Organisations based in Orkney
Football governing bodies in Scotland
Amateur association football in Scotland